Herschel Lashkowitz (April 2, 1918 – September 7, 1993) was an American politician from North Dakota, affiliated with the Democratic Party.

A lawyer and veteran of World War II, Lashkowitz served as mayor of Fargo for twenty years, from 1954 until 1974, when he was defeated for re-election.  He also served as a state senator for 18 years.

Lashkowitz was an independent candidate for Governor in 1960, but lost. He was also the Democratic nominee for U.S. Senator (class 3) in 1968, when he was defeated by longtime Republican incumbent Milton Young.

Electoral history

See also
North Dakota United States Senate election, 1968
United States Senate elections, 1968

External links
Brief profile at the Political Graveyard

Mayors of Fargo, North Dakota
1993 deaths
Presidents pro tempore of the North Dakota Senate
Democratic Party North Dakota state senators
1918 births
North Dakota lawyers
American military personnel of World War II
20th-century American lawyers
20th-century American politicians
Lawyers from Fargo, North Dakota